Pennarhodeus is a genus of mites in the family Rhodacaridae.

Species
 Pennarhodeus brevipennatus Karg, 2000
 Pennarhodeus decoris Karg, 2000
 Pennarhodeus pennatus Karg, 2000
 Pennarhodeus turris Karg, 2000

References

Rhodacaridae